Fitzhead is a village and civil parish in Somerset, England, situated approximately  north west of Taunton in the Somerset West and Taunton district.  The village has an estimated population of 264.

History

The parish of Fitzhead was part of the Kingsbury Hundred,

Governance
The parish council has responsibility for local issues, including setting an annual precept (local rate) to cover the council’s operating costs and producing annual accounts for public scrutiny. The parish council evaluates local planning applications and works with the local police, district council officers, and neighbourhood watch groups on matters of crime, security, and traffic. The parish council's role also includes initiating projects for the maintenance and repair of parish facilities, as well as consulting with the district council on the maintenance, repair, and improvement of highways, drainage, footpaths, public transport, and street cleaning. Conservation matters (including trees and listed buildings) and environmental issues are also the responsibility of the council.

The village falls within the non-metropolitan district of Somerset West and Taunton, which was established on 1 April 2019. It was previously in the district of Taunton Deane, which was formed on 1 April 1974 under the Local Government Act 1972, and part of Wellington Rural District before that. The district council is responsible for local planning and building control, local roads, council housing, environmental health, markets and fairs, refuse collection and recycling, cemeteries and crematoria, leisure services, parks, and tourism.

Somerset County Council is responsible for running the largest and most expensive local services such as education, social services, libraries, main roads, public transport, policing and  fire services, trading standards, waste disposal and strategic planning.

It is also part of the Taunton Deane county constituency represented in the House of Commons of the Parliament of the United Kingdom. It elects one Member of Parliament (MP) by the first past the post system of election, and was part of the South West England constituency of the European Parliament prior to Britain leaving the European Union in January 2020, which elected seven MEPs using the d'Hondt method of party-list proportional representation.

Landmarks
Fitzhead Court and The Manor date from the late 16th century. The building was constructed by Major Robert Cannon (died 1685) a royalist veteran of the Civil War, and passed through his successors to the Somerville Barons. The estate was sold to Baron Ashburton in 1840. The village is also home to two defunct village pumps.

Religious sites
The parish Church of St James the Great dates from the 15th century with expansion and restoration in the 19th century. It has been designated as a grade II* listed building. The cross in the churchyard is from the 14th century.

References

External links
 http://www.fitzhead.com

Villages in Taunton Deane
Civil parishes in Somerset